Zsófia Katalin Illésházy de Illésháza (1547–1599) was a Hungarian noblewoman, the sixth and youngest child of Tamás Illésházy and his second wife, Zsófia Földes. Her father functioned as Vice-ispán (Viscount; vicecomes) of Pozsony County. Her elder brother was Baron István Illésházy, who served as Palatine of Hungary between 1608 and 1609.

Family
In 1566, she married Ferenc Esterházy de Galántha (1533–1604), the first member of the prestigious House of Esterházy. They had the following children:

 Magdolna (26 January 1567 – 1 September 1616), married to László Kubinyi de Felsőkubin et Nagyolaszi (d. 1598)
 Ferenc I (b. 18 July 1568), died young
 Tamás (8 May 1570 – 1615 or 1616)
 István (4 March 1572 – 26 October 1596), died in the Battle of Keresztes
 János (b. 1574), died young
 Ferenc II (b. 1576), died young
 Farkas (1577 – 25 August 1643)
 Zsófia (29 October 1578 – 7 May 1620), married to Márton Révay de Riva et Trebosztó (1565–1630), who served as Vice-ispán of Turóc County
 Gábor (8 October 1580 – 28 December 1626), received the title of Baron in 1613
 Miklós (8 April 1583 – 11 September 1645), received the title of Baron in 1613, the title of Count in 1626, founder of the Fraknó branch, Palatine of Hungary (1625–1645), ancestor of the Princely House of Esterházy
 Dániel (26 July 1585 – 14 June 1654), received the title of Baron in 1613, founder of the Csesznek branch
 Pál (1 February 1587 – 17 January 1645), received the title of Baron in 1613, founder of the Zólyom branch
 Anna (22 May 1590 – 1638), married Count János Kéry de Kiskér

References

Hungarian nobility
16th-century Hungarian women
1547 births
1599 deaths